Reward-Tilden's Farm, or The Reward, is a historic home located at Chestertown, Kent County, Maryland.  It is a three bay long, two bay deep, two story, brick dwelling which appears to have been constructed in the 1740s.

It was listed on the National Register of Historic Places in 1977.

References

External links
, including photo from 1976, at Maryland Historical Trust

Houses in Kent County, Maryland
Houses on the National Register of Historic Places in Maryland
National Register of Historic Places in Kent County, Maryland